Kodanda Ramudu is a 2000 Indian Telugu-language Romance film, directed by S. V. Krishna Reddy. The film stars J. D. Chakravarthy, Rambha and Laya, with music composed by S. V. Krishna Reddy.

Plot 
Kodanda Ramudu, alias Ramu (J. D. Chakravarthy) is a tour guide in Araku Valley Borra Caves and is deeply in love with Mounika (Rambha), a city-bred rich girl who doesn't believe in the aspect of love. She thinks love is a tool that people use to fulfill their materialistic needs and assumes Ramu is faking her with his love. Mounika pretends and encourages Ramu to love her and makes a fool of him by insulting him when he expresses his love to her by bringing the saree weaved for marriage by his Peddamma (Nirmalamma). Enraged at Mounika's treatment, Ramu challenges Mounika that she will come back to him begging for marriage. Meanwhile, Latha (Laya) and Avadhani's (A.V.S.) music and dance troupe come to Araku Valley for annual celebrations. Latha develops an interest towards Ramu and becomes closer to him. When Mounika gets to know from her father (Ranganath) that Latha is the daughter of one of the richest Indians on the Earth for whom her father works, Mounika starts repenting about her decision to reject Ramu. Later, Mounika comes back to Ramu after realising his love and begs him to accept her love. As Ramu rejects Mounika, she makes a last-ditch attempt by going for a suicide at the famous suicide point. The story ends with Ramu saving Mounika and marrying her.

Cast

Music 
The songs were composed by S. V. Krishna Reddy and lyrics were penned by Veturi and Chandrabose.

References

External links 

2000 films
2000s Telugu-language films
2000 romantic drama films
Indian romantic drama films
Films directed by S. V. Krishna Reddy
Films scored by S. V. Krishna Reddy